Scythris anaecapitella is a moth of the family Scythrididae. It was described by Bengt Å. Bengtsson in 2014. It is found in Namibia and South Africa (Northern Cape).

References

anaecapitella
Moths described in 2014